The John Q. Hammons Student Center is an 8,846-seat multi-purpose arena on the campus of Missouri State University in Springfield, Missouri. It was built in 1976 and is the home of the Missouri State Bears.  The arena was replaced by the Great Southern Bank Arena in 2008.

References

External links
Map: 

Defunct college basketball venues in the United States
Indoor arenas in Missouri
Defunct sports venues in Missouri
Sports venues in Springfield, Missouri
Missouri State Bears basketball
Sports venues in Missouri